Idiomarina halophila is a Gram-negative, strictly aerobic, halophilic and non-motile bacterium from the genus of Idiomarina which has been isolated from sediment from a solar saltern from Gomso in Korea.

References

Bacteria described in 2015
Alteromonadales